Paul Boocock (born August 18, 1964) is an actor and writer based in New York City. His third solo comedy/performance piece, Boocock's House of Baseball, was nominated for two 2006 New York Innovative Theatre Awards - including best performer in a solo show.

Boocock is in the critically acclaimed avant-garde theatre company Elevator Repair Service. He may be best known for his work in PREMIUM BOB, the comedy duo which had downtown/cult success in the late 1990s - culminating in a TV pilot deal with ABC and an off-Broadway run at The Kaufman Theatre. Boocock appeared both on Law & Order: Criminal Intent (2006) and in Hal Hartley's Henry Fool (1997) as characters named Steve. He later appeared in Hartley's Ned Rifle (2014), the conclusion of a trilogy that began with Henry Fool (though his Ned Rifle character was named Wilson). Boocock is also the voice of Dr. Jonas Venture and other characters in the Cartoon Network Adult Swim series The Venture Bros. (2004–2020). In early 2018 Boocock created, and serves as the host of, the American comedy, culture and arts podcast titled Boocock.

Boocock went to Williams College and collaborates on performance projects with students at the Williams Summer Theatre Lab.

Filmography

Film

Television

References

External links
 
https://www.thewrap.com/venture-bros-lore-out-window/ ((The Wrap))
https://www.nytimes.com/2017/06/07/theater/raw-bacon-from-poland-review.html ((The New York Times))
http://www.huffingtonpost.com/entry/raw-bacon-from-poland-at-abrons-art-center_us_593490cde4b00573ab57a4b9 (Huffington Post)
https://www.timeout.com/newyork/theater/raw-bacon-from-poland (TimeOut New York)
UNDERGROUND The New Yorker
CRITIC'S NOTEBOOK; Now the Uncool Are the Coolest of All, The New York Times
Bankrolling Fields of Dreams, The New York Times
THEATER REVIEW; Peanuts, Cracker Jack and Partisan Politics,  The New York Times
Google Books
Paul Boocock
Paul Boocock, Actor and Writer
Boocock's House of Baseball Hits it Straight Up the Center
Baseball with a political twist
HIGHWAY TO TOMORROW

1964 births
Living people
Place of birth missing (living people)
20th-century American male actors
American male writers
American male voice actors
Williams College alumni
21st-century American male actors